The 1989–90 Detroit Red Wings season was the Red Wings' 58th season, the franchise's 64th. The season involved drafting Sergei Fedorov and Nicklas Lidström. Until 2016-17, this was the last season that the Red Wings failed to make the playoffs.

Offseason

NHL Draft

Regular season

Final standings

Schedule and results

Player statistics

Forwards
Note: GP = Games played; G = Goals; A = Assists; Pts = Points; PIM = Penalty minutes

Defencemen
Note: GP = Games played; G = Goals; A = Assists; Pts = Points; PIM = Penalty minutes

Goaltending
Note: GP = Games played; MIN = Minutes; W = Wins; L = Losses; T = Ties; SO = Shutouts; GAA = Goals against average

Scoring by goalies
Note: GP = Games played; G = Goals; A = Assists; Pts = Points; PIM = Points

References
Red Wings on Hockey Database

Detroit
Detroit
Detroit Red Wings seasons
Detroit Red Wings
Detroit Red Wings